Park Chae-rim (born March 28, 1979), known by the mononym Chae Rim, is a South Korean actress who debuted in 1994. She has starred in Korean dramas including All About Eve (2000), Dal-ja's Spring (2007), and Oh! My Lady (2010).

Career
Chae Rim debuted as Miss Haitai in 1994. Having starred in many television dramas, becoming famous for her roles in All About Eve and Dal-ja's Spring in the 2000s (decade). She enjoys great popularity as a Korean Wave star in China and Taiwan, having made several series there.

Chae Rim also co-hosted the MBC variety show Music Camp from 1999 to 2000. In 2010 Park returned to the small screen with Oh! My Lady, co-starring Siwon of Super Junior. It is a romantic comedy about a top star who finds himself living with his manager, a 35-year-old woman who is trying to earn money to get custody of her child.

In November 2018, Chae Rim signed with new agency Hunus Entertainment.

Personal life
Chae Rim married singer Lee Seung-hwan (14 years her senior) on May 24, 2003. On March 31, 2006, Lee's agency Cloud Fish released news of the couple's divorce, stating that due to personality differences, the couple had been separated since December 2005. 

In March 2014, she acknowledged that she was dating Chinese actor Gao Ziqi. Gao and Chae Rim were married in China on October 14, 2014. She gave birth to a son, Min-Woo, on December 2017.
 They divorced in 2020.

Filmography

drama 
 2010 China ZJTV: Fall in Love with Anchor Beauty (cameo)
 2010 SBS: Oh My Lady
 2009 MBC: Good Job, Good Job
 2008 KBS: Formidable Rivals
 2007 KBS: Dal-ja's Spring
 2006 China BTV: Secret History of Kangxi
 2006 Lost City in Snow Heaven (cameo)
 2005 Hong Kong ATV: Taming Of The Shrew / Princess Sheng Ping
 2004 TaiwanCTV: Warriors of The Yang Clan
 2004 TaiwanCTS: Love at the Aegean Sea
 2004 SBS Banjun Drama: Suite Room
 2004 KBS: Oh! Pil Seung, Bong Soon Young
 2003 KBS: Over the Green Fields
 2002 SBS: We are Dating Now
 2001 MBC: Four Sisters
 2000 SBS: Cheers for the Women
 2000 MBC: All About Eve
 2000 MBC: Air Force
 1999 Happy Together
 1999 MBC: I'm Still Loving You
 1999 SBS: KAIST
 1999 KBS: Lost One's Way / The Song Of Hope
 1998 MBC: Shy Lovers
 1998 MBC: Jump
 1998 KBS: As We Live Our Lives
 1998 SBS: My Mother's Daughters
 1997 MBC: Ban Buhl Ee
 1996 MBC: A Daughter's Choice
 1995 MBC: Pair
 1994: Journey
 1994: Warm River

Variety shows

Awards 
 2007 KBS Drama Awards: Top Excellence Award, Actress (Dal-ja's Spring)
 2007 China BQ Awards: Favorite Asian Star Award
 2006 China Annual Golden TVS Awards: Most Popular International Star
 2000 SBS Drama Awards: Popularity Award
 1999 MBC Drama Awards: Popularity Award
 1999 MBC Drama Awards: Best Couple Award
 1999 Baeksang Arts Awards: Best New Actress in TV (I'm Still Loving You)
 1998 MBC Drama Awards: Best New Actress

References

External links 
 Chae Rim at Cyworld
 
 

South Korean television actresses
South Korean entertainers
Actresses from Seoul
1979 births
Living people
South Korean Buddhists
IHQ (company) artists